Glyn Anthony Barker (born September 1953) is a British businessman who is chairman of Interserve (since September 2017), the law firm Irwin Mitchell and Berkeley Group Holdings (from 2020 for up to two years until a permanent replacement is identified).

Barker is a non-executive director of Aviva since February 2012 and Transocean Limited. Barker is an adviser for Novalpina Capital, a private equity firm.

References

Living people
1953 births
British chief executives
British chairpersons of corporations
Aviva people
Berkeley Group Holdings people